Vasile Pîntea is a Moldovan politician.

He served as a member of the Parliament of Moldova (2005–2009).

External links 
 Parlamentul Republicii Moldova
  List of candidates to the position of deputy in the Parliament of the Republic of Moldova for parliamentary elections of 6 March, 2005 of the Electoral Bloc “Moldova Democrata”
 List of deputies elected in the March 6 parliamentary elections
 Lista deputaţilor aleşi la 6 martie 2005 în Parlamentul Republicii Moldova

References

1951 births
Living people
Moldovan MPs 2005–2009
Electoral Bloc Democratic Moldova MPs
Our Moldova Alliance politicians